Groenewald is a surname. Notable people with the surname include:

Boetie Groenewald (born 1990), South African rugby union player
Brendon Groenewald (born 1991), South African rugby union player
Craig Groenewald, South African paralympic swimmer
Evert Groenewald, South African military personnel
Lambert Groenewald (born 1989), South African-born Zimbabwean rugby union player
Pieter Groenewald, South African politician
Tim Groenewald (born 1984), South African cricketer
Vaughn Groenewald (born 1974), South African golfer
Zhivago Groenewald (born 1993), Namibian cricketer

See also 

 Greenwald

Surnames of Dutch origin